The Directorate General of Forces Intelligence, commonly known as DGFI is the military intelligence section of the Bangladesh Armed Forces, tasked with collection, collation, and evaluation of strategic and topographic information, primarily through human intelligence (HUMINT). As one of the principal members of the Bangladeshi intelligence community, the DGFI reports to the Director-General and is primarily focused on providing intelligence for the Prime Minister, the Cabinet of Bangladesh, and the Armed Forces of Bangladesh.

The Director General leads the Directorate General of Forces Intelligence (more commonly known as DGFI), the military intelligence service of the Bangladesh Armed Forces.

List of Director General (DG) of Directorate General of Forces Intelligence (DGFI)

References

Military of Bangladesh
List